Distremocephalus is a genus of glowworm beetles in the family Phengodidae. There are about 11 described species in Distremocephalus.

Species
 Distremocephalus barrerai Zaragoza, 1986
 Distremocephalus beutelspacheri Zaragoza, 1986
 Distremocephalus buenoi Zaragoza, 1986
 Distremocephalus californicus (Van Dyke, 1918)
 Distremocephalus chiapensis Zaragoza, 1986
 Distremocephalus leonilae Zaragoza, 1986
 Distremocephalus mexicanus (Wittmer, 1963)
 Distremocephalus opaculus (Horn, 1895)
 Distremocephalus rufocaudatus Zaragoza, 1986
 Distremocephalus texanus (LeConte, 1874) (little Texas glowworm)
 Distremocephalus wittmeri Zaragoza, 1986

References

Further reading

 
 
 

Phengodidae
Bioluminescent insects